The Allegany County Courthouse is the Maryland Circuit court for Allegany County, Maryland, United States. It is located in Cumberland's Washington Street Historic District. Although many church spires dot the Cumberland landscape, it is the Allegany County Courthouse that dominates this city's skyline. The building is prominently sited along Washington Street, which rises sharply from Wills Creek running through the heart of Cumberland. Historically, courthouses in America have been one of the most architecturally impressive buildings within a community. In this way, the architecture of the building was able to convey the authority of a local government, as well as instill respect and recognition.

History 
In 1789, the Allegany County Court was created by Act of the Maryland General Assembly. As part of the Act, Washington County had been subdivided and Allegany County, a name derived from the Indian word "Oolikhanna," meaning beautiful stream, was formed. Local historians have reported that the first court cases in Allegany County were held in the home of John Graham and court business was held in a Green Street tavern owned by Abraham Faw. This was a temporary measure until a proper courthouse could be built.

First Court House
In 1793, the General Assembly authorized the construction of the county's first courthouse and jail, but it was not until 1799 that the courthouse was ready for use.  This first courthouse was built for a sum of $3,062.50.

In 1806, improvements were made by building records rooms for the Clerk of Court and the Registrar of Wills for a total sum of $1200.00.

Second Court House
In 1834, the courthouse had become too small for the county's increasing needs and a new courthouse was approved to be built for a sum of $5000.00.  This new courthouse was completed in 1841.

Thirty years later, in the 1860s, $75,000 in bonds were issued by the County Commissioners for the purpose of enlarging and remodeling the existing courthouse and for building a new jail.  The courthouse was improved and used for the next 30 years, until it caught fire and was destroyed on January 5, 1893.  Only the vaults of the Clerk of Court and Registrar of Wills were salvaged from the fire. The court has moved to the City Hall and Academy of Music building temporarily.

Third Court House
Designed in 1893, the Courthouse was the first major commission of local architect Wright Butler. Butler based his design for this public building on the Richardsonian Romanesque architectural style. The massing and detail of the courthouse are typical of this late 19th-century style, developed from the works of architect Henry Hobson Richardson. Characteristic of this style, the courthouse combines the use of brick highlighted with stone belt courses and presents a uniform rock-faced exterior finish. The building's ribbons of windows set deeply into the walls, and large arched entry are also typical Richardsonian features. Less typical is the courthouse's tower buttressed with round columns that rises above the three-story building. Construction of the building was completed for a total cost of $97,000.  One of the pinnacle examples of Richardson's work is the Allegheny County Courthouse in Pittsburgh, Pennsylvania, which Cumberland's Courthouse strongly resembles.

Notes

References
 Will H. Lowdermilk, "History of Cumberland", first published 1878, reprinted by Clearfield Co., October 1997, Paperback, . 
 Albert L. Feldstein, "Allegany County (Images of America: Maryland)", Arcadia Publishing, 2006,

External links

Buildings and structures in Cumberland, Maryland
County courthouses in Maryland
Towers in Maryland